Luis Manuel Ávila (born January 30, 1971) is a Mexican actor, comedian and singer of film and television who is best known for his roles of "Tomás Mora" in La fea más bella and "Junior P. Luche" in La familia P. Luche.

Life

He was named best actor in the First Festival of University Theatre UNAM.

He has worked in different performing activities since 1991. Theater: "Esperando al Zurdo" "Macbeth & Co" "Romeo y Julieta" "Don Juan Tenorio" "Yo Madre Yo Hija"  "Politico de Alcoba" and more, at this moment "La Caja".    

Film:  "Divina Confusión" El Octavo Pasajero" "Aspiración" "Debo No Niego" "En La Tierra".    TV: "La Fea Más Bella" "Camaleones" "Las Tontas No Van Al Cielo" "Triunfo del Amor" "Por Ella Soy Eva" and actually "La Familia Peluche season 3".   

He has a career as a comedian since 1995 with his characters Librado, Junior, Tomás and Zamora.   

Lately he has focused his career into the world music with his two albums "Biografía" and actually "El Riesgo" as part of the duet LOS LUISES who are visiting throughout Mexico and various cities in USA.

Biography 
At the age of 18, Luis Manuel Ávila entered the UNAM (National Autonomous University of Mexico) to study Business Administration. He got his bachelor's degree. He decided to pursue an acting career despite having an excellent academic performance to the point of obtaining, together with his thesis partner, the recognition for the Best Bachelor Thesis in Administration at the National Level by ANFECA (National Association of Faculties and Schools of Accounting and Administration).

Filmography

Telenovelas
2013: La tempestad – Olinto
2012: Por Ella Soy Eva – Onésimo Garza Torres
2011: Triunfo del Amor – Lucciano Ferreti
2009: Camaleones – Eusebio Portillo
2008: Las Tontas No Van al Cielo – Zamora
2006/2007: La Fea Más Bella – Tomás Mora Gutierrez
2004: Misión SOS – "'Raus Raus'"

TV series
2012: La Familia Peluche Third Season – "Junior P.Luche"
2012: Como dice el dicho – "Nino Rosales"
2007: La Familia Peluche Second Season – Junior P.Luche
2007: Objetos Perdidos – Various Characters
2006: Vecinos – Albañil/Casimiro Perez
2003/2005 Mujer, Casos de la Vida Real – "Various Characters"
2002–2004: La Familia Peluche First Season – Junior P.Luche
2000: Furcio – "Various Characters"
1998/1999: Derbez en Cuando – "Various Characters"
1998: El Balcón de Verónica – "Various Characters"

Films
 Divina Confusión (2007) – Policía 1
 Ahí viene Verónica (1999)

Short films
 Aspiración
 Luna y Mar
 Portaequipaje
 El Octavo Pasajero
 En La Tierra
 Debo No Niego

Theater
 El Juego que Todos Jugamos
 Macbeth & Co
 Romeo y Julieta
 Tramoya
 Invitación a la Muerte
 El Gran Inquisidor
 A Tu Intocable Persona
 Así Pasa Cuando Sucede
 Don Juan Tenorio
 Bolero
 El Baúl
 Yo Madre Yo Hija
 La Pareja Dispareja
 Político de Alcoba
 La Caja

Musicals
 Aladino
 El Jorobado de Nuestra Señora de París
 Scherezada

Dubbing
Dragon Ball Super: Super Hero - Gohan
Saint Seiya: The Lost Canvas - Cerberus Dante

References

External links

1971 births
Living people
Male actors from Mexico City
Mexican male comedians
Mexican male film actors
Mexican male telenovela actors
Mexican male television actors
Mexican male voice actors